Bolat Raimbekov (born 25 December 1986) is a Kazakhstani road bicycle racer, last for  of the UCI ProTour.

External links

Kazakhstani male cyclists
1986 births
Living people
20th-century Kazakhstani people
21st-century Kazakhstani people